SM U-56 was one of the 329 submarines serving in the Imperial German Navy in World War I.
U-56 was engaged in the naval warfare and took part in the First Battle of the Atlantic.

On 2 November 1916, U-56 was attacked by gunfire from the Imperial Russian Navy destroyer Grozovoi off Khorne Island, Norway (near Vardø). U-56 survived this attack. U-56 dropped off the crew of the Norwegian merchant ship Ivanhoe ashore at 07:45 on 3 November 1916 at Lodsvik. The Norwegian sailors were aboard the ship during the action of the previous day and their description matches with the Russian account.

Summary of raiding history

References

Notes

Citations

Bibliography

World War I submarines of Germany
1916 ships
U-boats commissioned in 1916
Maritime incidents in 1916
U-boats sunk in 1916
Missing U-boats of World War I
Ships built in Bremen (state)
Type U 51 submarines